Austrodromidia is a genus of crabs within the family Dromiidae. There are currently 5 species designated to the genus, with the type species being Austrodromidia australis.

Species 

 Austrodromidia aegagropila 
 Austrodromidia australis 
 Austrodromidia incisa 
 Austrodromidia insignis 
 Austrodromidia octodentata

References 

Dromiacea
Decapod genera